Paul Petts is an English former professional footballer who played as a winger.

Career
Petts began his career with Bristol Rovers, making 13 appearances in the Football League for them between 1978 and 1980. He then played for Shrewsbury Town, making a further 149 appearances in the league over five seasons. Petts later played in Wales for Merthyr Tydfil.

Personal life
His father John was also a professional footballer.

References

1950s births
Living people
English footballers
Bristol Rovers F.C. players
Shrewsbury Town F.C. players
Merthyr Tydfil F.C. players
English Football League players
Association football wingers